Lance Banning (January 24, 1942 – January 31, 2006) was an American historian who specialized in studying the politics of the United States' Founding Fathers. He taught mostly at the University of Kentucky.

Life
Banning was a native of Kansas City, Missouri. He graduated from the University of Missouri, and from Washington University in St. Louis with a master's and PhD.

He taught at Brown University, and University of Kentucky. He served as the Leverhulme Visiting Professor at the University of Edinburgh. In 1997, he taught at the University of Groningen.

He was among the scholars who was commissioned by the newly formed Thomas Jefferson Heritage Society in 1999 to review materials about Thomas Jefferson and Sally Hemings, after the 1998 DNA study was published indicating a match between the Jefferson male line and a descendant of Eston Hemings, the youngest son. The commission thought there was not sufficient evidence to conclude that Jefferson was the father of Hemings' children, and proposed his younger brother Randolph Jefferson, who had never seriously been put forward until after the 1998 DNA study.

Legacy and honors
 1997 Merle Curti Award for his Sacred Fire of Liberty: James Madison
 1997, Fulbright Fellowship at the University of Groningen in the Netherlands.
 National Endowment for the Humanities fellowship
 1979 Guggenheim Fellowship
 National Humanities Center

Works

Criticism
"A review of "Negro President": Jefferson and the Slave Power, by Garry Wills", The Claremont Institute, August 31, 2004

References

1942 births
2006 deaths
20th-century American historians
American male non-fiction writers
University of Missouri alumni
Washington University in St. Louis alumni
Brown University faculty
University of Kentucky faculty
Academic staff of the University of Groningen
Academics of the University of Edinburgh
Writers from Kansas City, Missouri
20th-century American male writers